The Customs House is an arts venue in South Shields, South Tyneside, North East England. It is the only non-amateur theatre in the borough, the local arts development agency, the largest gallery and, until recently, the only cinema.

History 
A customs house was first established in South Shields in 1848. The current building at Mill Dam was constructed in 1863. Meanwhile South Shields was declared a separate customs port (i.e. no longer part of the Port of Tyne for customs purposes) in 1865. The building was extended to the rear to provide local offices for the Merchant Navy in 1878.

The Customs House was acquired by the Tyne and Wear Development Corporation, along with the adjoining Daltons Lane warehouses, as part of the redevelopment plans, and the Customs House itself was converted into an arts and entertainment centre in 1994.

When the Daltons Lane warehouses were refurbished to form offices for the arts and entertainment centre in 2004 the builder found old mortuary slabs. With further research it was discovered that the building had previously been a morgue. The flats in front of this building were once a police station and a taxi office and it was concluded that any bodies found in the river in Mill Dam during that time were then transported into the mortuary directly behind the station.

Facilities 
The building comprises a theatre of 441 seats, a 145 seat studio, a gallery, a restaurant, a bar, a box-office and a community room. The offices are located in the former Daltons Lane warehouses.

The Customs House is managed by the Customs House Trust, a company limited by guarantee with charitable status. The founding members of the Trust were South Tyneside MBC, Tyne and Wear Development Corporation and Northern Arts and each had the right to nominate two members to the Board. The current Executive Director of the Customs House is Ray Spencer MBE.

See also 
Ed Waugh and Trevor Wood

Notes

External links

 Customs House - official site

Theatres in Tyne and Wear
Buildings and structures in South Shields
Arts centres in England